The 16525 /16526 Island Express is an Indian Railways train running between Krantivira Sangolli Rayanna Bangalore City railway station, Bangalore and Kanyakumari railway station, Kanyakumari. Train no. 16526 runs from Bengaluru to Kanyakumari, and Train No. 16525 runs in the reverse direction. The train runs daily through the state of Kerala (via , Ernakulam, Thrissur,  and ) and covers the 944 km journey in about 19 hours 15 minutes.

About the name of the train
No part of the train's route is on an island; the name was given because the predecessor of this train used to end its journey at the Cochin Harbour Terminus station in Willingdon Island, Cochin, until the mid-1970s. At that time, it was the only train that connected Bengaluru (Karnataka state) to Kerala. This train is hauled by the WAP-7, a 6,350 HP AC Passenger Locomotive.

Significance
Train number 16526 covers the 944 km journey in 19 hours while train 16525 takes close to 21 hours for the return journey. Due to the extremely slow speed of the train and the large number of stops in Kerala, this train has earned the moniker of being known as the "Supercrawler Express of Kerala", Despite this, the Island Express is still one of the most preferred trains by Keralites residing in Bengaluru for traveling to Kerala. This was the only daily train between Bengaluru and Trivandrum until early 2006.

Coach composition
Island Express has 22 coaches which includes 7 sleeper class coaches (S1–S7), six A/C 3 tier coaches (B1, B2, B3,B4,B5,B6), two A/C 2 tier coaches (A1, A2), one first A/C cum A/C two tier(HA1) and the rest been unreserved coaches . Season ticket holders can travel in selected sleeper class coaches for a specified duration.

Coach position

Coach position for 16525 Kanyakumari-KSR Bengaluru Express 

Coach position for 16526 KSR Bengaluru-Kanyakumari Express

Routes and halts
 Kanniyakumari
 Nagercoil Junction
 Thiruvananthapuram Central
 Kollam Junction
 
 
 
 Kottayam
 Ernakulam Town
 Thrissur
 Palakkad Junction
 Coimbatore Junction
 Erode Junction
 Salem Junction
 Bangarpet Junction
 Malur
 Whitefield
 Krishnarajapuram
 Bengaluru Cantonment
 Bangalore City

History

The exact history of the Island Express is somewhat hazy as surprisingly there are no accurate reports available about the early origins of the train. Legend passed down word of mouth has it that the train that is called the Island Express today started its run in the 1940s as some 3 or 4 slip coaches attached to an ancient 562/561 Cochin–Madras Express which ran out of Cochin Harbor Terminus (CHTS). The slip coaches attached to this would then be detached at Jolarpettai and attached to another train (Bangalore Mail) which would take them to Bangalore. Years passed by and sometime in the 1960s, these slip coaches grew into a separate train which was christened the 25/26 Cochin–Bangalore–Cochin Island Express. It continued to run between Cochin Harbor and Bangalore until 1976 when the Ernakulam–Kottayam–Thiruvananthapuram route was converted to broad gauge. The Island then had to say goodbye to its island as it was extended to Trivandrum. As new lines were commissioned it was extended to Nagercoil in 1988 and subsequently to Kanyakumari in 1990.

The Island Express briefly had through coaches to Mangalore Cntrl where It used to be attached/detached to the Link Mangala Exp (2625A/26A) at Palakkad Jn. This continued until 1993 when Mangala Exp was made an Independent Train. From 1993 onwards until 2000, The coaches were linked to the newly started 387/388 Coimbatore Mangalore Coimbatore Fast Passengers at Palakkad Jn.

The erstwhile 19/20 Cochin–Madras Express is today's illustrious 12624/12623 Chennai–Trivandrum Mail (Madras Mail) and the 25/26 Island Express is today officially, the 16525/16526 Kanyakumari–Bangalore "Island" Express.

The Island Express derives its name from the Willingdon Island, on which the CHTS station is situated and from where the train started its journey. The Express that goes to an Island, so very obviously brilliant. The name got so entrenched with the public, that even though it is no longer the official name of the train, it is still called so. The train lost Island as its official railways-recognized name once its destination was moved from Willington Island to TVC, NCJ and CAPE. Its official name today is Kanyakumari Express and Bangalore Express for the respective destinations. But the traveling public still calls the train The Island Express, reminiscent of its old name almost two generations ago, popularly and lovingly. Maybe no one uses the official names as there are other Bangalore and Kanyakumari Expresses and destination place names are not popular as train names anyway.

Accidents

Island Express was involved in an accident in July 1988 while crossing the Perumon railway bridge near Perinadu, Kollam, Kerala. 10 coaches of the train fell over Ashtamudi Lake, 105 people lost their lives and 200 people were injured.

It also met with another accident at Kuppam on 21 May 1967. The train, which left Bangalore at 6 pm, did not stop at the railway station and went on to hit the buffers at the end of the loop line around 9 pm.  Several lives were lost.

References

External links
 Island Express route map

Transport in Bangalore
Transport in Kanyakumari
Express trains in India
Rail transport in Karnataka
Rail transport in Tamil Nadu
Rail transport in Kerala
Named passenger trains of India